Baron von Tollbooth & the Chrome Nun is a collaborative studio album by Jefferson Airplane members Paul Kantner, Grace Slick, and David Freiberg, released in May 1973.

All of the trio's then-fellow Jefferson Airplane members, John Barbata, Jack Casady, Papa John Creach, and Jorma Kaukonen, are featured on the album. Also appearing are David Crosby, Jerry Garcia, Mickey Hart, The Pointer Sisters, and Craig Chaquico (the future lead guitarist of Jefferson Starship).

Background
The record was issued at the same time as Thirty Seconds Over Winterland.

However, on most of the tracks, Jerry Garcia of the Grateful Dead performs lead guitar and Chris Ethridge of the Flying Burrito Brothers performs bass.

"Your Mind Has Left Your Body" was the final studio track to feature Paul Kantner, Grace Slick, Jorma Kaukonen and Jack Casady until the 1989 Jefferson Airplane reunion album.

The album cover was illustrated by Drew Struzan under the direction of Ernie Cefalu.

Track listing

Personnel
Paul Kantner – vocals on all tracks except "Across the Board" and "Fishman", rhythm guitar on all tracks except "Across the Board" and "Fishman", glass harmonica on "Harp Tree Lament" and "White Boy"
Grace Slick – vocals, piano on all tracks except "Ballad of the Chrome Nun", "Flowers of the Night", and "Harp Tree Lament"
David Freiberg – vocals on all tracks except "Across the Board" and "Fishman", piano on "Ballad of the Chrome Nun", "Harp Tree Lament", keyboards on all other tracks except "Walkin'" and "Fishman"
John Barbata – drums, percussion
Chris Ethridge – bass on all tracks except "Your Mind Has Left Your Body", "White Boy", "Across The Board" and "Fishman"
Jerry Garcia – guitar on all tracks except "Flowers of the Night", "Your Mind Has Left Your Body", and "Harp Tree Lament", steel guitar on "Ballad of the Chrome Nun" and "Your Mind Has Left Your Body", banjo on "Walkin'"
Craig Chaquico – lead guitar on "Ballad of the Chrome Nun", "Flowers of the Night", and "Fishman"
David Crosby – vocals on "The Ballad of the Chrome Nun"
Jack Traylor – acoustic guitar on "Flowers of the Night", vocals on "Flowers of the Night", "White Boy", and "Sketches of China"
Jack Casady – bass on "Your Mind Has Left Your Body", "White Boy", "Across The Board" and "Fishman"
The Pointer Sisters – vocals on "Fat"
Papa John Creach – electric violin on "Walkin'"
Mickey Hart – gongs on "Your Mind Has Left Your Body" and "Sketches of China", water phones on "Your Mind Has Left Your Body"
Jorma Kaukonen – lead guitar on "Your Mind Has Left Your Body"

Production
Paul Kantner – producer
Grace Slick – producer
David Freiberg – producer
Bob Matthews – recording engineer, mixdown engineer
Betty Cantor – recording engineer, mixdown engineer
Jim Gaines – recording engineer
Al Schmitt – mixdown engineer
Daggett – equipment head
Drew Struzan, Bill Garland – illustrations
Jim Marshall – eye photography
Pacific Eye & Ear – album design
Bill Thompson – management

References

Grace Slick albums
Paul Kantner albums
1973 albums
Albums recorded at Wally Heider Studios
Albums with cover art by Drew Struzan
Grunt Records albums